Noatak may refer to one of the following:
 Noatak, Alaska
 Noatak River
 Noatak National Preserve
 Noatak Wilderness